Admiral Oscar Stanley Dawson (13 November 1923 – 23 October 2011) was a four-star admiral in the Indian Navy. He served as the 11th Chief of the Naval Staff from 1 March 1982 to 30 November 1984. From 1983 until his retirement, he also served as the chairman of the Chiefs of Staff Committee of the Indian Armed Forces. He previously served as the Flag Officer Commanding-in-Chief (FOC-in-C) of the Southern Naval Command and Flag Officer Commanding Eastern Fleet (FOCEF). Adm Dawson was also the Director of Naval Operations during the Indo-Pakistan War of 1971.

After retirement, Admiral Dawson served as the Indian High Commissioner to New Zealand. He also campaigned for a number of environmental causes and worked on the rehabilitation of disabled people. Admiral Dawson died of cerebral haemorrhage at the Command Hospital, Bangalore in October 2011.

Early life
Oscar Stanley was born in Burma on 13 November 1923 to E. S. and Oliva Dawson. The family had origins in the Nadar community of Tamil Nadu and professed Christianity. He received his high school and college education in his hometown Nagercoil, at Scott Christian College. During the Japanese occupation of Burma in March 1942, his family was evacuated back to India.

Naval career
Upon arriving in India, Dawson continued with college studies, but left to enlist in the Royal Indian Navy Volunteer Reserve. He received his commission as a midshipman on 8 January 1943.

He received training as a specialist in navigation and direction in the United Kingdom. During World War II, he participated in the Arakan Campaign 1944-1945 and served on escort convoys in the Bay of Bengal and the Arabian Sea. Following the independence of India, he was absorbed into the Indian Navy, with promotion to lieutenant in 1948.

Among his early assignments, Dawson served as the naval aide-de-camp to the first President of India, Dr. Rajendra Prasad, during 1953–54. He was promoted lieutenant-commander on 1 April 1956. Later he served as the fleet navigating officer. His appointments on shore included that as the commandant, Navigation and Direction School; director, Tactical School and chief staff officer, Cochin Area.

Dawson was promoted to substantive captain on 30 June 1969. He was the Director of Naval Operations (DNO) at Naval Headquarters (NHQ) during the Indo-Pakistan War of 1971. Some of the Indian Navy's most famous operational successes, including Operation Trident, Operation Python and the naval blockade of East Pakistan were accomplished during his tenure as DNO. Dawson was awarded the Ati Vishisht Seva Medal (AVSM) for his services and leadership during the conflict.

He graduated from the National Defence College, New Delhi in 1973. Subsequently, promoted to commodore and then to rear admiral on 8 March 1976, he served as the Flag Officer Commanding Eastern Fleet (FOCEF) between February 1978 and March 1979. Promoted to vice-admiral on 1 April 1979, he served as the Flag Officer Commanding-in-Chief (FOC-IN-C), Southern Naval Command. In 1981, he was awarded the Param Vishisht Seva Medal (PVSM) for his distinguished service to the Indian Navy.

Dawson was promoted to Admiral and succeeded Adm R L Pereira as the 11th Chief of the Naval Staff, taking command on 1 March 1982. Among his most significant contributions in office was the planning and vision for Project Seabird.

Dawson retired from service on 30 November 1984, having spent 19 of his 41-year naval career at sea.

Later life
Dawson served as the Indian High Commissioner to New Zealand between August 1985 and September 1987.

After retirement, Dawson lived in Bangalore and Nagercoil and actively supported a number of environmental causes. He led the campaign to clean Ulsoor lake in Bangalore. He was instrumental in the campaign to discontinue the use of leaded petrol in the 1990s. He was also a skilled pianist.

Since 2005, he served as the president of the charitable organization, Anga Karunya Kendra, focused on supporting rehabilitation of disabled people. The organization primarily supports patients with polio, muscular dystrophy and cerebral palsy, as well as survivors of accidents. A major focus of the organization is on rehabilitation using prostheses.

Death
Dawson died of cerebral hemorrhage on 23 October 2011, aged 87. He never married and was survived by his sister, Thelma.

References 

1923 births
2011 deaths
Indian Navy admirals
Chiefs of the Naval Staff (India)
Flag Officers Commanding Eastern Fleet
People from Kanyakumari district
Anglo-Indian people
Recipients of the Param Vishisht Seva Medal
Royal Indian Navy officers
National Defence College, India alumni
Indian expatriates in British Burma
Recipients of the Ati Vishisht Seva Medal